The Master of the Saint Lambrecht Votive Altarpiece was an Austrian painter active between about 1410 and 1440.  His name is derived from a panel, formerly in St. Lambrecht's Abbey in the village of Sankt Lambrecht in Styria.  This, now in the Alte Galerie in Graz, depicts a former abbot of the monastery, Heinrich Moyker, kneeling before the Virgin of Mercy; with him is Hemma of Gurk.  Moyker was the donor of the altarpiece, which depicts the Hungarian victory over the Ottoman Turks.  A number of other paintings are believed to be by his hand, as is the design of a stained glass window in Sankt Lambrecht; some of these have also been ascribed to the so-called Master of the Linz Crucifixion, while others are believed to be by Hans von Judenburg or Hans von Tübingen.  The latter appears to have lived too late to be identified with the Master's oeuvre.  Stylistically, the Master's ascribed body of work indicates a familiarity with International Gothic as practiced in Bohemia.  Other stylistic traits suggest knowledge of the work being done in Cologne and Westphalia, while still others show aspects of the Viennese, French, and Burgundian schools.

References
Master of the Saint Lambrecht Votive Altarpiece at Answers.com
  L. Baldass: On the chronology, workshop leadership style and derivation of the master of St. Lambrecht votive tablet. In: Church Art VI, 1934, S 104–106.
 L. von Wilcken et al.:. outline of the history of Western art. Kröner, Stuttgart 2000, p 192
 Karl Garzarolli-Thurnlackh: To identity of Votivtafelmeisters of St. Lambrecht with Hans von Burg Jews. In: K. Cernohorsky (ed.): Festschrift for the sixtieth birthdays of EW Brown. Dr. Benno Filser Verlag, Augsburg / Vienna 1931, pp. 47ff.
 K. Oettinger: Hans von Tübingen and his school. German Association for Art Research, Berlin 1938
 O. Black: Art of the Middle Ages, the catalog of the National Museum Joanneum Graz 1955, p 46

15th-century births
15th-century Austrian painters
Saint Lambrecht Votive Altarpiece, Master of the
Year of death unknown